Khan Na Yao is a khwaeng (subdistrict) of Khan Na Yao District, in Bangkok, Thailand. In 2020, it had a total population of 47,313 people.

References

Subdistricts of Bangkok
Khan Na Yao district